A coin board or merchandise board is a variation on pull-tab games.  A game board of this type typically comes with a registered package of pull-tab tickets, a signers card, and a pay-out slip.

When a ticket is sold, the player opens the ticket to reveal its hidden numbers. If a number on the ticket matches a number on the game board, the player wins a prize and/or a chance at one or more seal prizes, which are revealed at the end of the game.

The game board displays the winning numbers along with the prizes. Some of the winners receive instant cash only, while some of the winning numbers match numbers on coins, wallets, or small panels that are built into the board. When a player opens a ticket containing one of these numbers, the game manager removes the coin or panel and gives it to the player. When the coin or panel is removed, a prize is revealed that may consist of instant cash, merchandise, and/or a chance at a seal prize. Instant cash or merchandise winnings are given to the player immediately by the manager.

If a player wins a chance at a seal prize, that player's name is added to the signers card. When the game ends—all the tickets sell out, or all the prizes are won—the manager opens the seals on the game board (or, in some versions, scratches off an opaque substance) to reveal the winning numbers. The players whose names appear next to the winning numbers on the signers card win a seal prize. The seal prizes are usually the most valuable prizes.

United States collector coins are embedded in most coin boards sold in the US. Sometimes they are visible, and sometimes they are hidden behind panels. Coin boards contain only coin and cash prizes. Merchandise boards also contain coins, but some or all of the prizes consist of merchandise rather than cash.

The pay-out slip that is typically provided with each board lists the number of winners and values of all prizes. This information may be used for accounting purposes and to verify that the game complies with local gaming regulations.

References

Lotteries
Gambling terminology